The Marapi, or Mount Marapi is a complex volcano in West Sumatra, Indonesia. Its name means Mountain of Fire, and it is the most active volcano in Sumatra. A number of cities and towns are situated around the mountain, including Bukittinggi, Padang Panjang and Batusangkar.

According to legend, the mountain is the site first settled by the Minangkabau people after their ship landed on the mountain when it was the size of an egg and surrounded by water. There are large numbers of upright burial stones in the region which are oriented in the direction of the mountain, indicating its cultural significance.

See also 
 List of volcanoes in Indonesia

References

External links 
 Indonesian Directorate of Volcanology and Geological Hazard Mitigation entry

Stratovolcanoes of Indonesia
Subduction volcanoes
Volcanoes of Sumatra
Complex volcanoes
Active volcanoes of Indonesia
Mountains of Sumatra
Landforms of West Sumatra
Holocene stratovolcanoes